Sergius I (Sergios I ; d. 9 December 638 in Constantinople) was the Ecumenical Patriarch of Constantinople from 610 to 638. He is most famous for promoting Monothelite Christianity, especially through the Ecthesis.

Sergius was born of Syrian Jacobite heritage. He first came to power as Patriarch of Constantinople in 610. He was also a known supporter of Emperor Heraclius, crowning Heraclius as emperor himself in 610. Sergius also provided support to Heraclius throughout his campaign against the Persians. Sergius also played a prominent role in the defense of Constantinople against the combined Avar-Persian-Slavic forces during their invasion of Constantinople in 626. Sergius' connections to both political and religious authorities gave him to his influence in both the religious and political communities to further Monoenergism as the primary formula of Christ within the church. This was met with much opposition, especially from that of the Chalcedonian supporters, Maximus the Confessor and Sophronius. In response to their resistance to accept the ideas of Monoenergism, Sergius responded with the Ecthesis, a formula which forbade discussing the idea that the Person of Christ had one or two energies in favour of Monothelitism being the idea that the Person of Christ had two natures that were united by a single will. The Ecthesis was signed by Heraclius in 638, the same year that Sergius died.

The Ecthesis would only be seen as an accepted doctrine for two years; the death of Pope Honorius I resulted in a significant reduction in Monothelitism support. The Ecthesis was condemned in 640 by Pope John IV. Additionally, both Sergius and Pope Honorius were condemned as heretics by the church in 680-681 by the Third Council of Constantinople.

Early career
It is believed that Sergius was already of some importance prior to being chosen as the patriarch of Constantinople. Sergius was a deacon in Haghia Sophia in addition to be a guardian of the harbor. Sergius became the patriarch of Constantinople on 18 April 610. Following the traditions of the Patriarch of Constantinople, it was Sergius who crowned Heraclius Emperor in October of 610 and baptized Heraclius' daughter. Sergius also counseled Heraclius after the death of his wife Eudokia and prior to his marriage to Martina, Heraclius' niece. As such, Sergius developed a close relationship with the Emperor, a connection that would serve him later on.

In 614, the Persian army seized Jerusalem, in process damaging the Church of the Holy Sepulchre and capturing the True Cross, originally discovered by the Empress Helena. A counterattack was initiated against the Persians in 622 by Heraclius. Sergius provided the necessary wealth for the campaign to succeed through the funds of the church. Sergius succeeded at this by reporting funds in the form of Church revenues and vessels. It is even said that the bronze ox from the Forum Tauri was melted down to help provide materials for coinage. 
Sergius can also be credited with saving Constantinople's status as the capital of the Eastern Roman Empire. Constantinople had been suffering throughout the campaign against the Persians as grain was the primary source of food for the city and Egypt, the provider, had been lost. Heraclius believed that moving the capital to Carthage would make it easier to provide the population with food. Attempting to save the Empire enough money to allow Constantinople to remain the capital, Sergius traded the free bread citizens received in the city, a practice from older Roman times, as the government could no longer afford this, an idea that didn't logically work.

By 622, Sergius' abilities were well recognized by Heraclius. As a result, Heraclius assigned Sergius the care of both his son Theotokos and Constantinople. In 626 during the absence of the Emperor's campaign against Sassanid Persia, the Avars and Sassanid Persians, aided by large number of allied Slavs, laid siege to Constantinople. Along with the magister militum Bonus, he had been named regent and was in charge of the city's defense. He led a litany to the Hodegetria icon just before the final attack of the Avars, and right after completing it a huge storm crushed the invading fleet, saving Constantinople. It is reported that Sergius carried the Icon of the Mother of God around the city walls of Constantinople. The storm was credited as a miracle from the Mother of God, though Sergius was credited with persuading her to the point of involvement. It was rumoured that a previous hymn of the Eastern Orthodox Church was composed in honour of this battle and of Sergius.

Monothelitism

Background
With the victory over the Persians, rifts in the religious society began to emerge again between Monophysite and Chalcedonian beliefs. Both Heraclius and Sergius planned to adopt a form of 'Monenergism'. The hope was that their religious formula would be able to connect the different religious beliefs and provide a sense of unity within the empire.

Sergius promulgated the belief that Jesus Christ had two natures but one will, known as Monothelitism. It was hoped that the idea would appeal to both Chalcedonians and to Monophysite followers in the empire as it fused basic principles taken from both realms of practice. Initially, Sergius had success, converting the Patriarchs Athanasius and Cyrus of Alexandria and Antioch respectively.  It was not until 633 that Heraclius's Monoenergism began to receive resistance from the Chaldeconians, primarily from the monks Sophronius and Maximus the Confessor. In 633, Sophronius had left for Africa to dispute the doctrine that Cyrus has put upon the Egyptians. To this end, Sergius sent his archdeacon Peter to a synod in Cyprus in 634, hosted by Archbishop Arkadios II and with additional representatives from Pope Honorius I. The anti-Monoenergist side in Jerusalem, championed by Maximus and Sophronius, sent to this synod Anastasius Apocrisiarius pupil of Maximus, George of Resh'aina pupil of Sophronius, and two of George's own pupils, and also eight bishops from Palestine. When the two sides were presented to the emperor, the emperor switched to Monothelitism and so with Sergius.

It was also at this point around 633 that Sergius sought to stress the importance of Monothelitism to Pope Honorius. Sergius' letter to Honorius informed the Pope of the significance of the union achieved in Alexandria and for an agreement in how Christ's will should be viewed. Honorius ultimately agreed with the Sergius' belief, impressed at Sergius' ability to gain theological agreement in the eastern Churches, and confessed to Christ having only one will but two natures as well in his reply to Sergius. Honorius retracts from this position to a degree in a following letter to Sergius, believed to be a result of the Synodical Letter from Sophronius to Honorius.

The Ecthesis
Sergius sought to create a formula that would be able to fully please both the Chalcedonians and the Monophysites. The eventually forbade discussion on whether Christ had one or two energies within him and instead insisted that the Lord had two different natures incarnated within a single will and body. Sergious would lead to call this statement the Ecthesis, or Exposition. These beliefs were in similar accordance to the beliefs of Hominus. This furthered Sergius' formula in realms of both Chalcedonian and Monophysite practice. It can be argued that Hominus did not quite understand the point of Sergius' formula, but it is accepted that he supported it regardless. Still, the Ecthesis was not well received by all Chalcedonians; Sophronius viewed it poorly, to the point that he published a decree against it. Emperor Heraclius too was hesitant to sign off on Sergious' work. While Sergius had finished the Ecthesis in 636, it was not signed into approval by Heraclius until 638, the same year as Sergius' death.

The Ecthesis of 638 CE was issued by Emperor Heraclius with the agreement of Sergius. This document defined Monothelitism as the official imperial form of Christianity, and it would remain very controversial in the next years after its implementation.

Effects of the Ecthesis
The initial effects of the Ecthesis were strongly felt throughout religious society. Sergius' successor, Pyrrhus, who Sergius had handpicked to take over, declared his confidence in Monothelitism belief as the official imperial doctrine. Furthermore, the majority of the subsequent Eastern successors were of Monophysite faith, furthering the spread of Monothelitism doctrine. Chalcedonian belief had been severely reduced and the remainder of its practice was in a critical state. This would all change the following year in a very contrasting way.

Death and denunciation
Sergius died in December of 638, only months after Heraclius had instated the Ecthesis. 

Despite the strong initial spread to Monothelitism belief, 640 brought an abrupt end to this. A series of events happened in short order following 638. First, the new pope, Severinus, showed strong resistance to accepting Monothelitism belief. His successor, Pope John IV, was an even stronger opponent of the practice. Finally, following the death of Heraclius in 641, both the subsequent Emperors Constantine III and Constans II were of orthodox practice and appeared to have removed the Ecthesis as the official imperial doctrine, by request of Pope John IV. This effectively crushed the remaining foundation of Monothelitism doctrine as Orthodox teachings appeared to quickly restore back throughout the Empire.

By 680, all Monothelite support had faded and Orthodox belief was in full order again. The resulting Roman Easter synod of 680 concluded that Christ had two wills and that all who had opposed this belief were to be condemned as heretics. Monothelitism was finally declared a heresy at the Third Council of Constantinople (the Sixth Ecumenical Council), AD 680–681, and both Patriarch Sergius and Pope Honorius were declared to be heretics. Honorius remains the only condemned pope to this day. As quoted from the council:

"…Honorius some time Pope of Old Rome, as well as the letter of the latter to the same Sergius, we find that these documents are quite foreign to the apostolic dogmas, to the declarations of the holy Councils, and to all the accepted Fathers, and that they follow the false teachings of the heretics…"

The Council lasted a total of eighteen sessions in declaring the heresy of Sergius, the first being in November 680 and the last being in September 681.

References

Sources
Alexander, Suzanne Spain. "Heraclius, Byzantine Imperial Ideology, and the David Plates." Speculum. 52.2 (1977): 218–222. Print.
 
Allen, Pauline, and Bronwen Neil. Maximus the Confessor and his Companions Documents from	Exile. 1. New York, New York: Oxford University Press, 2002. Print.
Ekonomou, Andrew J. Byzantine Rome and the Greek Popes: Eastern Influences on ... , Parts 590–752. 1.Plymouth, UK: Rowman & Littlefield Publishers, Inc., 2007. Print.
Brock, Sebastian P., "An Early Syriac Life of Maximus the Confessor", Analecta Bollandiana 91	(1973): 299–346. Web.
Hussey, J.M. The Orthodox Church in the Byzantine Empire. 1. Oxford, England: Oxford University Press, 1986. eBook.
L. and C., Concilia, Tom. "The Sentence Against the Monothelites. Session XIII.." NPNF2-14. The Seven Ecumenical Councils 680. col. 943.Christian Classics Ethereal Library. Web. 16 Oct 2013. http://www.ccel.org/ccel/schaff/npnf214.
Louth, Andrew. Maximus the Confessor. 1. London: Taylor & Francis e-Library, 2005. 7-16. eBook.	
Rose, Hugh James. A New General Biographical Dictionary, Volume 12. 12. London: Bell & Co Cambridge, 1857. 8. Web.
Runciman, Steven. The Byzantine Theocracy: The Weil Lectures, Cincinnati. Cambridge, Britain: Cambridge University Press, 1977. 54–61. Print.
Ullmann, Walter. A Short History of the Papacy in the Middle Ages. 2. New Fetter Lane, London: Methuem & Co. LTD, 1972. Print.
Vauchez, André. Encyclopedia of the Middle Ages. 2012. Cambridge, Britain: James Clarke & Co, 2002. Print. http://www.oxfordreference.com/view/10.1093/acref/9780227679319.001.0001/acref 9780227679319-e-2620?rskey=egvat3&result=1.
 

638 deaths
7th-century patriarchs of Constantinople
7th-century Christian theologians
Byzantine regents
Avar–Byzantine wars
People declared heretics by the first seven ecumenical councils
Year of birth unknown